Andrée Damant (20 September 1929 – 6 December 2022) was a French actress.

Life and career
Damant starred in many commercials. She also specialized in the roles of sympathetic Méridionales often Marseillaises pure strain, which led from time to time to interpret on screen characters from the world of Marcel Pagnol.

Damant died on 6 December 2022, at the age of 93.

Filmography

Theater

References

External links
 

1929 births
2022 deaths
20th-century French actresses
21st-century French actresses
French film actresses
French stage actresses
French television actresses
Actors from Avignon